The Yea Baronetcy, of Pyrland in the County of Somerset, was a title in the Baronetage of Great Britain. It was created on 18 June 1759 for William Yea, who was High Sheriff of Somerset in 1760. The title became extinct on the death of the third Baronet in 1864.

Yea baronets, of Pyrland (1759)
Sir William Yea, 1st Baronet (died 1806)
Sir William Walter Yea, 2nd Baronet (1784–1862)
Sir Henry Lacy Yea, 3rd Baronet (1798–1864)

See also
 Colonel Lacy Walter Giles Yea, oldest son of Sir William Walter Yea, 2nd Baronet

References

Extinct baronetcies in the Baronetage of Great Britain